The Democratic Union of the Rwandese People (UDPR) is a political party in Rwanda.

History
The party was established in 1992. It joined the Rwandan Patriotic Front-led alliance prior to the 2003 parliamentary elections, winning a single seat. It remained part of the alliance for the 2008 parliamentary elections, retaining its one seat. However, it lost its seat in the 2013 elections. It returned to parliament after winning one seat in the 2018 elections.

References

External links
Official website

Political parties in Rwanda
Political parties established in 1992
1992 establishments in Rwanda